Cannabis in Romania is illegal for recreational and for medical use. Although it was technically legalized for medical use in 2013, it has not been eliminated from the Table I of High Risk Drugs, and as such its use is prohibited. 

Some of the earliest evidence of the psychoactive use of cannabis have been found in Romania, including the archaeological sites of Frumușica and Gurbănești.

Prohibition
In 1928, Romania established laws for countering narcotics, including hashish and its preparations.

Medical cannabis
A limited medical cannabis law was passed in 2013, allowing for the use of low-THC (below 0.2%) derivatives of the plant only.

Advocacy for reform
Save Romania Union Youth is the first youth organisation of a Romanian political party to openly support the decriminalisation of cannabis.

References

 
Romania
Drug policy of Romania